Kaski is a Finnish surname. Notable people with the surname include:

Heino Kaski (1885–1957), Finnish composer, teacher, and pianist
Oliwer Kaski (born 1995), Finnish ice hockey defenceman

See also
Kasky

Finnish-language surnames
Surnames of Finnish origin

fr:Kaski